A coal burner (or pulverized coal burner) is a mechanical device that burns pulverized coal (also known as powdered coal or coal dust since it is as fine as face powder in cosmetic makeup) into a flame in a controlled manner.
Coal burner is mainly composed of pulverized coal machine, host of combustion machine (including combustion chamber, automatic back and forth motion system, automatic rotation system, the combustion air supply system) control system, ignition system, the crater and others.

Mechanism 

In the worksite, a coal burner works with the coal pulverizer and coal hopper usually. The coal in the hopper is conveyed to the coal pulverizer by screw conveyor.  The coal pulverizer will crush the coal into pulverized coal. In the coal burner, the pulverized coal mixes with air (High-speed air flow is generated by the draft fan on the coal burner), and is ignited by the oil burning igniter.

Ignition 
There are mainly two ways to ignite the coal burner. Manual way and automatic way, no matter which way it adopts, the coal burner often needs fuel (oil, gas, etc.) as the combustion medium. The difference is that the high-energy ignition devices which generate sparks replace people's hands.

Use 
Pulverized coal burners have a wide range of uses in industrial production and daily life, such as providing heat for boilers, hot mix asphalt plant, cement kiln, metal furnace, annealing, quenching furnace, precision casting shell burning furnace, melting furnace, forging furnace and other heating furnace or kiln.

Requirements for coal 
 Mark of coal: bituminous coal;
 Gross calorific value: ≥5000kcal/kg (≥ 20000kJ/kg); 
 Net calorific value: ≥4200kcal/kg;
 Volatile matter: ≥25%;
 Ash Content: ≤10%; 
 Total moisture: ≤35%; 
 Inherent moisture: ≤14%; 
 Total sulphur: ≤1%; 
 Particle size: ≤20mm.
Note: These indexes are the lowest requirements for the coal, the better coal will be better at practice.

See also
 Oil burner
 Gas burner
 Pulverized coal-fired boiler
 Asphalt plant
 Boiler
 Portable stove
 Burner (disambiguation)
 Heater

References

External links
 PULVERIZED COAL BURNER // Mech4840
 Coal Fired Power Generation 
 Pulverised coal combustion (PCC)

Burners
Heating